1976 college football season may refer to:

 1976 NCAA Division I football season
 1976 NCAA Division II football season
 1976 NCAA Division III football season
 1976 NAIA Division I football season
 1976 NAIA Division II football season